Yattee is a free and open-source unofficial YouTube client for iOS, macOS and tvOS. On iOS and tvOS, it is available on the App Store, from the official GitHub repository (although this option requires sideloading) and on TestFlight. The macOS version is available from the official repository and in Homebrew. It is intended to be used as a "privacy-respecting" alternative to the official YouTube app.

Features 
Yattee was originally released as Version 1.0.0 on 12 November 2021 and was created by Arkadiusz Fal. Notable features include:

 Native user interface built with SwiftUI with customization settings
 Multiple instances and accounts, fast switching
 SponsorBlock, configurable categories to skip
 Player queue and history
 Fullscreen playback, Picture in Picture and AirPlay support
 Stream quality selection
 User accounts
 Subsriptions
 User playlists
 Trending
 Channels
 Channel playlists
 Search
 Search suggestions
 Search filters
 Popular
 Subtitles
 Comments

Technology 
Yattee does not use the official YouTube API, but instead utilises the Invidious Developer API and the Piped JSON API. The app currently uses both the built-in AVPlayer and mpv as backends. Yattee also includes SponsorBlock, a popular free and open-source technology that automatically skips the sponsored segments of videos. Version 1.4 implemented Return YouTube Dislike, an open-source extension that re-adds the dislike counter to the app.

See also 

 Invidious
 Piped

References

External links 

 
 iOS TestFlight Link
 

Free media players
YouTube
Free and open-source software
IOS software